was a  after Man'en and before Genji. This period spanned the years from March 1861 through March 1864.

Change of era
 March 29, 1861 (Man'en 2/Bunkyū 1, 19th day of the 2nd month) :  The new era name of Bunkyū (meaning "Literate Story") was created because of a belief drawn from Chinese astrology that the 58th year of any zodiacal cycle brings great changes.  The previous era ended and a new one commenced in Man'en 2.

Events of the Bunkyū era
 1861 (Bunkyu 1): Ukai Gyokusen established the first commercial photography studio (Eishin-dō) in Edo.
 January 1862 (Bunkyū 1, 12th month): The Bonin Islands (Ogasawara Islands) are re-confirmed as a territory of Japan, following up "discovery" of the islands in Kanbun 10 (1670) and a shogunate expedition to the islands in Enpō 3 (1675).
 1862 (Bunkyū 2): The Bunkyū Reforms relax restrictions on daimyōs which had been imposed by former Tairō  Ii Naosuke in the Ansei era. 
 September 14, 1862 (Bunkyū 2, 21st day of the 8th month): Namamugi Incident. Satsuma retainers kill English merchant Charles Lennox Richardson at Namamugi on the Tōkaidō road.
 April 22, 1863 (Bunkyū 3, 5th day of the 3rd month): Shōgun Iemochi travelled in a great procession to the capital. He had been summoned by the emperor, and had 3,000 retainers as escort. This was the first time that a shōgun had visited Heian-kyō since the visit of Iemitsu in Kan'ei 11 (1634) – 230 years before.
 April 28, 1863 (Bunkyū 3, 11th day of the 3rd month): Emperor Komei made an Imperial progress to the Kamo Shrines. He was accompanied by the shōgun, all the principal officials and many feudal lords. This was the first Imperial progress since Emperor Go-Mizunoo visited Nijō Castle more than 230 years before; and no Emperor had visited Kamo since Emperor Go-Daigo honored both shrines in Kenmu 1 (1334).
 April 29, 1863 (Bunkyū 3, 12th day of the 3rd month): In the early morning, Aizu accepts under its patronage the men of the Rōshigumi, who went on to form the Shinsengumi.
 May 2, 1863 (Bunkyū 3, 15th day of the 3rd month): The Rōshigumi men who were taken under Aizu patronage go to Konkaikōmyōji Temple to make their first formal, public appearance, and pay their respects to their new patron, Matsudaira Katamori. As Katamori is unavailable, they are instead met by two of his senior retainers.
 August 15–17, 1863 (Bunkyū 3, 2nd-4th of the 7th month): Bombardment of Kagoshima in retaliation for the Namamugi Incident.

See also
Japanese calendar

Notes

References
  Jansen, Marius B. (2000). The Making of Modern Japan. Cambridge: Harvard University Press. ;  OCLC 44090600
 Nussbaum, Louis Frédéric and Käthe Roth. (2005). Japan Encyclopedia. Cambridge: Harvard University Press. ; OCLC 48943301
 Ponsonby-Fane, Richard A. B. (1956).  Kyoto: The Old Capital of Japan, 794–1869. Kyoto: The Ponsonby Memorial Society. 
 Satow, Ernest Mason and Baba Bunyei. (1905).  Japan 1853–1864, Or, Genji Yume Monogatari. Tokyo: . 
 Tanaka, Hiroyuki.  "The Ogasawara Islands in Tokugawa Japan".   Kaiji Shi Kenkyuu (Journal of the Maritime History). No. 50, June, 1993, Tokyo: The Japan Society of the History of Maritime.

External links
 National Diet Library, The Japanese Calendar – historical overview plus illustrative images from library's collection
 Bunkyū 3 procession of Shogun towards Kyoto – link to digitized image of woodblock print by Utagawa Tsuyanaga

Japanese eras
1860s in Japan
1861 establishments in Japan
1861 introductions
1860s disestablishments in Japan